Fireburst is a racing game developed by exDream and published by IndiePub and Bigben Interactive. It was released for Microsoft Windows on April 25, 2012, and PSN and XBLA on June 14, 2013. It received mixed reviews from critics.

Gameplay 
In Fireburst, the Fireboost covers the cars with flames and turns them into a weapon. With the Fireboost, players can kill other opponents, but the player's car will explode if their heat level becomes too great.

Plot 
Charles Randolph, known as "Hightower", invented the Fireburst Racing League and is determined to be the first champion in order to restore his dignity and reputation.

Reception 
The game has an aggregate score of 59/100 on Metacritic for the PC version, indicating "mixed or average reviews", while the XBLA version has an aggregate score of 35/100, indicating "generally unfavorable reviews".

Carolyn Petit of GameSpot rated the PC version of the game 5/10 points, calling it "good-looking" and its boost mechanic exciting, but saying that it lacked interesting single-player content. Similarly, John Blyth of Official Xbox Magazine UK rated the XBLA version 5/10 points, calling it a "perfectly average experience", but criticizing the game's destruction mode as "dull". Bryan Dupont-Gray of Hardcore Gamer rated the game 2/5 points, saying that the fact it was a party racing game was a "misstep".

References 

2012 video games
Nacon games
Multiplayer and single-player video games
PlayStation Network games
Racing video games
Windows games
Xbox Live Arcade games